The Bulletin of Economic Research is a quarterly peer-reviewed academic journal covering the fields of economics, econometrics, and economic history that is published by John Wiley & Sons. It was established in 1948 and publishes full-length articles alongside shorter referenced articles, notes and comments, and survey articles.

According to the Journal Citation Reports, the journal has a 2020 impact factor of 0.619, ranking it 334/353 of journals in the category "Economics".

References 

(7) :63-70.

External links 
 

Wiley-Blackwell academic journals
English-language journals
Publications established in 1948
Quarterly journals
Economics journals